Dactyladenia hirsuta is a species of plant in the family Chrysobalanaceae. It is endemic to Ivory Coast and Ghana. Its natural habitats are wet evergreen forests. It is threatened by extensive logging of its habitat, the effects of mining and the establishment of commercial plantations.

References

External links
 

hirsuta
Flora of Ghana
Flora of Ivory Coast
Taxa named by Émile Auguste Joseph De Wildeman